A landmass, or land mass, is a large region or area of land that is in one piece and not broken up by oceans. The term is often used to refer to lands surrounded by an ocean or sea, such as a continent or a large island. In the field of geology, a landmass is a defined section of continental crust extending above sea level.

Continents are often thought of as distinct landmasses and may include any islands that are part of the associated continental shelf. When multiple continents form a single contiguous land connection, the connected continents may be viewed as a single landmass. Earth's largest landmasses, from largest to smallest, are:

 Africa-Eurasia
 America (landmass)
 Antarctica
 Australia (landmass)

See also 
 Coastline paradox
 Continent
 Boundaries between the continents of Earth
 Island
 List of islands by area
 Landform
 Glossary of landforms
 Mainland
 Supercontinent

References

Landforms
Geography terminology
Geology terminology